Bethany Baptist Church may refer to:

 Bethany Baptist Church (Newark, New Jersey)
 Bethany Baptist Church (Chislehurst, New Jersey)
 Bethany Baptist Church (New York City)
 Bethany Baptist Church (South Norfolk) located in Chesapeake, Virginia. 
 Bethany Baptist Church (Tashkent), in the Mirzo-Ulugbek District of Tashkent